Majali (Arabic: المجالي) is a prominent Jordanian political family that has been based in the town of Al Karak since at least the 1770s. The Majali family originate from the Tamimi family and were named Al-Majali when they were exiled from Al-Khalil/Hebron by the Ottoman rule at the time. Family members were in Al Karak for long periods of time and served both the Ottoman Turks and the Hashemite family that has ruled Jordan since 1921. They have occupied senior positions in the government and military.

Notable figures
  Tawfeq al-Majali (1880–1920), Jordanian representative in the Ottoman Parliament (Maba'othan)
 Premier Hazza' al-Majali (1916–1960), Prime Minister of Jordan
 H.E Ayman Hazza' al-Majali (21st Century), Deputy Prime Minister of Jordan
 Eteiwi Al-Majali (1950–2015), Member of the House of Representatives
 Field Marshal Habis Al-Majali (1914–2001), Jordanian Chief of Staff
 Premier Abdelsalam Al-Majali (1925–2023), Prime Minister of Jordan
 Nasouh Salim Al Majali, Minister of Culture and Information, 1989-1990
Lt. Gen. Hussein Al-Majali (born 1960), Commandant of Jordanian Public Security Forces
 Lt. Gen. Basheer Al-Majali (born 1960), Member of the Arab Interior Ministers Council
Brig.General Abdelmajid Almajali, was a Jordanian commander in the Arab-Israeli 1967 war.
 Samer Al-Majali (21st century), Jordanian businessman
 Rakan Al Majali (21st century), Former Minister of State for Media Affairs and Communications Jordan
 Nasr Almajali 1952 Journalist Jordan UAE and United kingdom

References

Jordanian families
People from Al Karak
Political families of Jordan